Sir William Rae, 3rd Baronet (14 April 1769 – 19 October 1842), was a Scottish politician and lawyer.

Life

He was born at Old Assembly Close off the Royal Mile in Edinburgh, son of Margaret Stewart, youngest daughter of John Stewart of Blairhall and David Rae, Lord Eskgrove. He was educated at the High School in Edinburgh and studied law at the University of Edinburgh from 1785, qualifying as an advocate in 1791.

His first major role was as Sheriff of Orkney and Shetland in 1801, but in 1809 he transferred to an equivalent post as Sheriff of Edinburgh, which he held until 1819. He succeeded his father to the baronetcy in 1815.

He was Member of Parliament for Anstruther Burghs, in Fife, from 1819 to 1826, Harwich, Essex, England, from 1827 to 1830, Buteshire in 1830 and from 1833 to 1842, and for Portarlington, Queen's County, Ireland, from 1831 to 1832.

He served as Lord Advocate from 1819 to 1830 and from 1834 to 1835. In the aftermath of the Peterloo Massacre, he reported to the Home Secretary, Viscount Sidmouth, on radical unrest in Scotland. He was made a Privy Councillor on 19 July 1830.

Grant's Old and New Edinburgh tells us that he was present at the Great Edinburgh Fire of 1824, actively trying to extinguish the flames of the building on the Royal Mile at the head of Old Assembly Close as it was "the house of his birth".

He died aged 73 at St Catherines, near Mortonhall in south Edinburgh on 18 October 1842.

He is buried with his father and mother on the south-west corner of St Michael's church in Inveresk. The stone is modest.

Family

In 1793 he married Mary Stuart.

Sources

References

External links
 

1769 births
1842 deaths
Scottish lawyers
Lord Advocates
Alumni of the University of Edinburgh
Members of the Parliament of the United Kingdom for Fife constituencies
Members of the Parliament of the United Kingdom for English constituencies
Members of the Parliament of the United Kingdom for Scottish constituencies
Members of the Parliament of the United Kingdom for Portarlington
Members of the Privy Council of the United Kingdom
UK MPs 1818–1820
UK MPs 1820–1826
UK MPs 1826–1830
UK MPs 1830–1831
UK MPs 1831–1832
UK MPs 1832–1835
UK MPs 1835–1837
UK MPs 1837–1841
UK MPs 1841–1847
Baronets in the Baronetage of the United Kingdom
Scottish sheriffs